The lotus, Nelumbo nucifera, is an aquatic plant that plays a central role in the art of Indian religions such as Hinduism, Buddhism,  Jainism and Sikhism. 

In Asian art a lotus throne is a stylized lotus flower used as the seat or base for a figure.  It is the normal pedestal for divine figures in Buddhist art and Hindu art, and often seen in Jain art. Originating in Indian art, it followed Indian religions to East Asia in particular.

Hinduism

Hindus revere it with the divinities Vishnu and Lakshmi often portrayed on a pink lotus in iconography; historically, many deities, namely Brahma, Saraswati, Lakshmi, Kubera, usually sit on a stylized lotus throne. In the representation of Vishnu as Padmanabha (Lotus navel), a lotus issues from his navel with Brahma on it. The goddess Saraswati is portrayed on a white lotus. The lotus is the symbol of what is divine or immortal in humanity, and also symbolizes divine perfection. The lotus is the attribute of sun and fire gods. It symbolizes the realization of inner potential, and in Tantric and Yogic traditions, it symbolizes the potential of an individual to harness the flow of energy moving through the chakras (often depicted as wheel-like lotuses) flowering as the thousand-petaled lotus of enlightenment at the top of the skull.

Vishnu is often described as the "Lotus-Eyed One" (Pundarikaksha). The lotus's unfolding petals suggest the expansion of the soul. The growth of its pure beauty from the mud of its origin holds a benign spiritual promise. In Hindu iconography, other deities, like Ganga and Ganesha, are often depicted with lotus flowers as their seats.

The lotus plant is cited extensively within Puranic and Vedic literature, for example:

Buddhism

In the Aṅguttara Nikāya, the Buddha compares himself to a lotus (padma in Sanskrit, in Pali, paduma), saying that the lotus flower rises from the muddy water unstained, as he rises from this world, free from the defilements taught in the specific sutta. 

In Buddhist symbolism, the lotus represents purity of the body, speech and mind, as if floating above the murky waters of material attachment and physical desire. According to the traditional biographies, Gautama Buddha's first seven steps made lotus flowers appear.   Lotus thrones are the normal pedestal for most important figures in Buddhist art, and often that of other Indian religions.

In Tibet, Padmasambhava, the Lotus-Born, is considered the Second Buddha, having brought Buddhism to that country by conquering or converting local deities; he is normally depicted holding a flower.  One account of his birth is that he appeared inside a lotus flower.

Confucianism

In Chinese culture, Confucian scholar Zhou Dunyi 1017–1073) wrote (borrowing from Gautama Buddha's famous metaphor):

The lotus is the emblem of Macau and appears on its flag.

Jainism

The founders (tirthankaras) of Jainism are portrayed seated or standing on lotus thrones. As his name suggests, the Jain tirthankara Padmaprabha is also represented by the symbol of a lotus. Padmaprabha means 'bright as a red lotus' in Sanskrit. It is said in Śvetāmbara sources that his mother had a fancy for a couch of red lotuses – padma – while he was in her womb.

Manichaeism

Chinese Manichaeism borrowed the iconography of Chinese Buddhism, frequently depicting religious figures revered in Manichaeism seated upon lotus thrones in its religious art.

Christianity

Since the introduction of Christianity to India, the iconography of the Saint Thomas Christians has depicted the Saint Thomas Christian cross, also called the Persian cross, resting on a lotus throne, a stylised lotus flower. Likewise, following the introduction of Christianity to China by the Church of the East, the Nestorian cross was frequently depicted on a lotus flower in Chinese Christian iconography.

Baháʼí Faith

The international Baháʼí Faith community adopted the symbolism of the lotus in the design of the Lotus Temple in New Delhi, India.

Cultural

In the classical written and oral literature of many Asian cultures the lotus is present in figurative form, representing elegance, beauty, perfection, purity and grace, being often used in poems and songs as an allegory for ideal feminine attributes. In Sanskrit the word lotus (पद्म padma) has many synonyms: since the lotus thrives on water, ja (denoting birth) is added to words for water to derive synonyms for lotus, like rajiv,  ambuja (ambu (water) + ja (born of)), neerja (neera (water) + ja (born of)), pankaj, pankaja (panka(mud) + ja(born of)), kamal, kamala, kunala, aravind, arvind, nalin, nalini and saroja and names derived from the lotus, like padmavati (possessing lotuses) or padmini (full of lotuses). These names and derived versions are often used to name girls, and to a lesser extent boys, throughout South and Southeast Asia.

The lotus flower is the state flower of several Indian states, including Karnataka, Haryana, and Andhra Pradesh. The lotus flower is the election symbol of the Bharatiya Janata Party, one of the major political parties in India.

Symbolism 
It has been considered a symbol of beauty, absolute purity, honesty, rebirth, self-regeneration, enlightenment.
It was considered a supreme plant by Egyptians for its fragrant transformative scent while living its alternating existence below and above the water surface. Interestingly it also was used by them as a medium to induce altered states of consciousness and make contact with other realms of existence. Blue lotus was considered as a symbol of sun rising out of night. 

In Hindu philosophy lotus is regarded to be the first born of creation and a magic womb for the universe and gods. Associations of it have also been made to longevity,fertility,wealth and knowledge. 

Its considered a symbol of freedom from desire, material attachment while invoking purity at level of mind, speech and action by Buddhist tradition. The also connected:  
•The symbolism of victory of spirit over that of intelligence, knowledge and wisdom with Blue lotus.
•"White lotus" to symbolism of Bodhi being awakened, ascent towards mental purity and spiritual perfection. It also implies a state of spiritual maturity connect to pacification of one's nature.
•"Pink lotus" is considered as Buddha's true lotus and the supreme of all.

See also

 Lotus position
 Ashtamangala (Eight Auspicious Symbols)
 Om mani padme hum - "the jewel in the lotus"

References

Further reading

External links

Indian iconography
Hindu iconography
Hindu symbols
Buddhist iconography
Buddhist symbols
Jain iconography
Jain symbols
Christian iconography
Christian symbols
Bahá'í Faith
Manichaeism
Confucian culture